Renate Reinsve (born 24 November 1987) is a Norwegian actress. She made her film debut in Oslo, August 31st (2011), before starring in the critically acclaimed The Worst Person in the World (2021), with her performance earning her the Cannes Film Festival Award for Best Actress, and a nomination for the BAFTA Award for Best Actress in a Leading Role.

Early life and education 
Born in Solbergelva in 1987 and educated at Kunsthøgskolen i Oslo, Reinsve then joined the Trøndelag Teater.
Reinsve had a traumatic upbringing and suffers from posttraumatic stress after events which occurred when she was between nine and 16 years old. Although she has made reference to this period in her life, she is unwilling at present to go into details about what happened.

After being expelled from school at 16, Reinsve left Norway for Scotland and stayed in a hostel in Edinburgh. Running out of money, she was given a job in the bar of the hostel by the manager as he "felt sorry for [her]".

Career 
In 2014, she received the Hedda Award for her role in Besøk av gammel dame, an adaptation of Friedrich Dürrenmatt's play . Since 2016, she has been contracted to Det Norske Teatret. Her films include Oslo, August 31st (2011), The Orheim Company (2012) and Welcome to Norway (2016). On television, she has been a main character in Nesten voksen and side character in Hvite gutter. 

In 2021, Reinsve played the principal character Julie in Joachim Trier's film The Worst Person in the World, which premiered at the 2021 Cannes Film Festival. On Late Night with Seth Meyers, Reinsve mentioned that she was considering quitting acting the day before she was offered the role of Julie, and had considered carpentry as a backup plan to acting. Trier had written the part of Julie specifically for her.  In 2022, she was cast opposite Sebastian Stan in Aaron Schimberg's psychological drama A Different Man.

Filmography

Film

Television

Accolades

References

External links 
 

1987 births
Living people
Cannes Film Festival Award for Best Actress winners
Norwegian film actresses
Norwegian stage actresses
Norwegian television actresses
Oslo National Academy of the Arts alumni
People from Nedre Eiker
21st-century Norwegian actresses